Gathers is a surname. Notable people with the surname include:

 Hank Gathers (1967–1990), American basketball player
 James Gathers (1930–2002), American sprinter
 Rico Gathers (born 1994), American basketball player

See also
 Mathers, surname